Jharkhandi cuisine encompasses the cuisine of the Indian state of Jharkhand. Staple foods of Jharkhand are rice, dal and vegetables. Common meals often consist of vegetables that are cooked in various ways, such as curried, fried, roasted and boiled. Many traditional dishes of  Jharkhand may not be available at restaurants. However, on a visit to a local village, one can get a chance to experience such exotic foods. Some dish preparations may be mild with low oil and spice content, although pickles and festive dishes may have such characteristics.

Foods and dishes
Malpua: It is a dish in Jharkhand which is usually prepared during the Holi festival.
Arsa Roti: It is a sweet dish prepared during festivals. Rice flour and sugar or jaggery are used in preparation.
Chhilka Roti: It is bread prepared by using rice flour and dal. It is served with chutney, vegetables and meat.    

Dhooska: Also spelled , it is a common food in Jharkhand. They are deep fried rice flour pancakes that may be served with gram curry and potatoes. 

Aaru ki sabzi: It is made with a root vegetable found in Jharkhand only.
Chakor Jhol: It is a wild edible leafy vegetable, cooked in red rice soup.
Sanai ka phool ka bharta: It is a recipe from rural Jharkhand made of Sanai (Crotalaria juncea) flowers.
Moonj Ada:  It is a spicy dal, cooked over a low flame with a dash of lemon and chilli for flavour.
Dumbu: Dumbu is a rice dessert. 

Tilkut: Tilkut is a sweet prepared with pounded sesame-seed cookies made with jaggery batter or melted sugar.

Meat salaan: It is a popular meat dish consisting of lamb curry and diced potatoes which is spiced with garam masala. 
Maduwa khassi: It is smoked skin intact mutton served with rice.
Spicy chicken: It is yet another common meat dish.
Rohad Haku: It is a dish of fried fish. The fish is dried in the sun and then stir fried in oil. Lemon and vinegar are added to spice it up. 
Mushroom: Rugra or Puttu is a type of edible mushroom which grows during the monsoon season and is used for vegetable. 
Bamboo shoot: Bamboo shoots are used as vegetables in Jharkhand.
Red ant chutney: It is a dish made of mashed red ants and their eggs.

Koinar Saag: The leaf of Koinar tree (Bauhinia variegata) is used as a vegetable.
Putkal (Ficus geniculata) ka saag: It is a sautéed leafy vegetable.
Pitha: Authentic Jharkhandi Dish made up of rice flour with Urad or Chana Dal.

Alcoholic beverages
Handia: Handia or Handi is a common rice beer in Jharkhand. People drink it during festivals and marriage feast. 
Mahua daru: It is an alcoholic beverage in Jharkhand which is prepared using the flowers of Mahua tree (Madhuca longifolia).

Food security
The twenty-four districts of Jharkhand receive supplemental food security supplies as per the National Food Security Act, 2013 of India. In the past, food supplies were distributed to the districts in phases, which some have criticized as problematic. In June 2015, Ram Vilas Paswan, the Minister of Consumer Affairs, Food and Public Distribution for the government of India stated a preference toward the Food Security Act to be implemented all at once, rather than in phases. In this manner, Paswan stated a preference for distributions to be completed in entirety by September 1, 2015.

References

Further reading

External links
Jharkhand Food. Mapsofindia.com.
Jharkhandi Cuisine . Jharkhandobserver.com.
 Traditional Jharkhand Food pandareviewz.com.

 
Jharkhand
Culture of Jharkhand